MF-TDMA ("Multi-frequency time-division multiple access") is a technology for dynamically sharing bandwidth resources in an over-the-air two-way communications network.

See also 
 Channel access method
 Time-division multiplex (TDM)

Radio resource management
Media access control